Charles Neville Douglas Dixey (7 November 1881 – 6 March 1947), known as Neville Dixey, was a British Liberal Party politician who was Chairman of Lloyd's of London three times, as an underwriter he specialised in the marine insurance market.

Background
He was the eldest son of Charles Douglas Dixey. He was educated privately. He married, in 1913, Marguerite Isabel Groser. They had three sons. One son Paul, was also Chairman of Lloyds in the 1970s.

Professional career
He was an underwriting member of Lloyd's. In 1928 he became an elected Member of Committee of Lloyd’s. He was Chairman of Lloyds in 1931, 1934 and 1936. In 1936 while Chairman of Lloyd's he was involved in discussions with the Chancellor of the Exchequer regarding budget leaks to members of the stock exchange which resulted in J.H.Thomas, the Secretary of State for the Colonies being forced to resign.

Political career

Dixey served as a Justice of the peace in Hertfordshire.
He was Liberal candidate for the Acton Division of Middlesex at the 1922 General Election. Acton had been a new seat in 1918 that had been won by a Unionist. It was in a part of Middlesex that had always returned Unionists. The Liberals had not even run a candidate in 1918 and unsurprisingly he finished in third place. He was next Liberal candidate for the Southampton Division at the 1923 General Election. Southampton was a two-member constituency that the Liberals had lost to the Unionists in 1922. At the 1923 elections, he and his running mate finished behind the Unionist and Labour candidates.
He was then Liberal candidate for the Holderness Division of Yorkshire at the 1924 General Election. This was a Unionist seat that had last been won by a Liberal in 1922 and had only been narrowly lost in 1923. He may have entertained hopes of winning but the 1924 elections were not good for the Liberals;

In November 1924 he was immediately re-selected as prospective Liberal parliamentary candidate for Holderness. He spent the next 5 years nursing the constituency in preparation for another general election. With the Liberal party experiencing something of a revival he will have had genuine hopes of winning. However, in 1929, the Labour party, who had not run a candidate in Holderness before, decided to intervene and took away enough votes from Dixey to allow the Unionist to hang on;

He did not stand for parliament again. His wife Marguerite remained active in the Liberal party throughout the 1930s and into the 1940s as Honorary Secretary of the Women's Liberal Federation, and also serving on the Liberal party National Executive.

Family
Dixey’s granddaughter, Judy Dixey, was elected a Liberal Democrat councillor in Camden, London, in May 2022.

References

1881 births
1947 deaths
Liberal Party (UK) parliamentary candidates
Insurance underwriters